The 1956–57 Greek Football Cup was the 15th edition of the Greek Football Cup. The competition culminated with the Greek Cup Final, held at Karaiskakis Stadium, on 29 July 1957. The match was contested by Olympiacos and Iraklis, with Olympiacos winning by 2–0.

Calendar
From Round of 32 onwards:

Knockout phase
In the knockout phase, teams play against each other over a single match. If the match ends up as a draw, extra time will be played and if the match remains a draw a replay match is set at the home of the guest team which the extra time rule stands as well. If a winner doesn't occur after the replay match the winner emerges by a flip of a coin.

Bracket

Quarter-finals

|}

Semi-finals

|}

Final

The 15th Greek Cup Final was played at the Karaiskakis Stadium.

*According to the Greek FA's official site, the match was played on 30 July.

References

External links
Greek Cup 1956-57 at RSSSF

Greek Football Cup seasons
Greek Cup
Cup